Dobu or Dobuan is an Austronesian language spoken in Milne Bay Province of Papua New Guinea. It is a lingua franca for 100,000 people in D'Entrecasteaux Islands.

Phonology

Consonants 

 The lateral flap  may fluctuate with an alveolar vibrant flap  depending on the dialect of the speaker.
  may also fluctuate with a fricative  within vocabulary.

Vowels 

  may be heard as slightly more centralized  when following labialized consonants in unstressed positions.

External links 
 An open access collection of singing in Dobu is available through Paradisec.
 Historical open access collections of recordings in Dobu are available through Paradisec, including the Malcome Ross collection (MR1) and two Arthur Campbell collections (AC1 and AC2)

References 

Nuclear Papuan Tip languages
Languages of Milne Bay Province
D'Entrecasteaux Islands